Rachel Elfreda Fowler (10 December 1872 – 1951) was an English literary scholar and lecturer in art and history at the University of Oxford.

Early life
Rachel Fowler was born in London on 10 December 1872, the youngest daughter of Sir Robert Fowler (1828-1891), member of parliament and Lord Mayor of London, and his wife Sarah Charlotte Fowler, née Fox. Elfreda was one of eleven children. She received her advanced education at Westfield College and then at the University of Oxford where she studied modern languages.

Career
Fowler completed her PhD at the University of Paris in 1905 on the subject of "Une Source Française des Poèmes de Gower" which discussed the sources for John Gower's poetry.

She worked as a nurse in Paris for two years during the First World War and later lectured in art and history at the University of Oxford.

Death and legacy
She committed suicide in 1951. Her papers are held by Queen Mary Archives. She was the subject of a biographical monograph by Genevieve O. Davidson in 1952.

Selected publications
 Une Source Française des Poèmes de Gower. Macon, 1905.

References

Further reading
Davidson, Genevieve O. (1952) Rachel Elfreda Fowler. C. Tinling

1872 births
1951 suicides
20th-century British women
Women art historians
University of Paris alumni
Nurses from London
Academics of the University of Oxford
British women historians
Daughters of baronets
British expatriates in France
Suicides in the United Kingdom